Nocturno is a studio album from Puerto Rican singer Roy Brown with the band Radio Pirata. The album was released under Brown's label Discos Lara-Yarí in 1991.

Background and recording

Nocturno was recorded at Horizon Music Studios in San Juan, Puerto Rico. Roy Brown was accompanied by the group Radio Pirata, led by Rucco Gandía. Gandía himself contributed the song "Mujer sola". Although the backing vocals appears the names of singers Lunna & Ex Menudo Ray Reyes, both of them were substituted by Gilda Gónzalez & Raül Reyes ( Ray’s Brother ) who became Radio Pirata’s Lead Vocalist.  The album also features the fifth Roy Brown song based on a poem by Luis Palés Matos, and the third based on a poem by Clemente Soto Vélez. There's also a song written by Puerto Rican writer Pedro Cabiya. The song "La borrachera de Charles Baudelaire" is based on the writings of the French poet of the same name.

Track listing

Personnel

Musicians

Notes 

1991 albums
Roy Brown (Puerto Rican musician) albums